Ministry of Higher Education (MOHE) was a government ministry in Saudi Arabia that oversaw tertiary education in the country. Established in 1975, it was disbanded and subsequently merged into the Ministry of Education in 2015 following a royal decree issued by the newly crowned monarch, King Salman.

History 
The Ministry of Higher Education was established in accordance with the Royal Decree No. 1/236 dated 8/5/1395 Hijri (corresponding to 19/05/1975) issued by the newly ascended monarch, King Khalid. The ministry was responsible to look after the growing higher education sector in Saudi Arabia. By the late 2000s, calls were being made within the Saudi academic circles asking for the ministry to be merged with the Ministry of Education. On 29 January 2015, the newly crowned King Salman approved the long-awaited demand and issued a royal decree that instructed the ministry to be merged with Ministry of Education. Khalid bin Abdullah Al-Sabti was the last minister to hold the position.

See also 

 Khalid Al Angari

References 

Education in Saudi Arabia